The list of ship launches in 1932 includes a chronological list of some ships launched in 1932.


References

Sources
 

1932
Ship launches